Tímea Babos was the defending champion, but lost in the second round to Mona Barthel.

Unseeded Alison Van Uytvanck won the title, defeating Dominika Cibulková in the final, 6–3, 3–6, 7–5.

Seeds

Draw

Finals

Top half

Bottom half

Qualifying

Seeds

Qualifiers

Lucky loser
  Viktória Kužmová

Draw

First qualifier

Second qualifier

Third qualifier

Fourth qualifier

Fifth qualifier

Sixth qualifier

External links
 Main draw
 Qualifying draw

Hungarian Ladies Open - Singles
Hungarian Ladies Open
Lad